Journal of Pharmaceutical and Biomedical Analysis is a peer-reviewed medical journal that covers the interdisciplinary aspects of analysis in the pharmaceutical, biomedical and clinical sciences. The journal is published by Elsevier.

Abstracting and indexing 
The journal is abstracted and indexed in:

 Analytical Abstracts
 Research Alert
 Current Contents - Life Sciences
 Current Contents - Social & Behavioral Sciences
 Current Contents
 Elsevier BIOBASE

According to the Journal Citation Reports, the journal has a 2021 impact factor of 3.571.

References

External links 

 

English-language journals

Elsevier academic journals
Pharmacology journals
Publications with year of establishment missing